Pasolini is an Italian surname. Notable people with this surname include:

Angelo Pasolini (1905–1959), Italian football player
Pier Paolo Pasolini (1922–1975), Italian film director and writer
Renzo Pasolini (1938–1973), Italian motorcycle road racer
Uberto Pasolini (born 1957), Italian film producer and director

Italian-language surnames